Żydowce-Klucz is a municipal neighbourhood of the city of Szczecin, Poland situated on the right bank of Oder river, south-east of the Szczecin Old Town, and Middle Town. As of January 2011 it had a population of 2,450.

Żydowce-Klucz comprises Żydowce and Klucz.

References 

Neighbourhoods of Szczecin